Francesco Leonetti (27 January 1924 – 17 December 2017) was an Italian poet, novelist, art critic, teacher and political activist.

Biography
Leonetti was born in Cosenza in Calabria. In 1955 he moved to Bologna to study philosophy. There he met Pier Paolo Pasolini and Roberto Roversi, and together they co-founded the magazine Officina. In the 1960s he co-founded with Elio Vittorini and Italo Calvino the literary magazine Il Menabò. In 1963 he joined the Neoavanguardia avant-garde Italian literary movement.

Leonetti collaborated with Pasolini again in 1964, playing the part of Herod Antipas in The Gospel According to St. Matthew. He also provided the voice of the sparrow in The Hawks and the Sparrows (1966) and played the part of the servant Laio in the 1967 film Oedipus Rex.

In the 1970s he co-edited with Nanni Balestrini the magazine Alfabeta. In 1974 he authored a monograph on Italian sculptor Arnaldo Pomodoro. From 1975 to 1995 he taught Aesthetics at the Brera Academy in Milan.

Selected works
 Sopra una perduta estate (1942) 
 La cantica (1959)
 L’incompleto (1964)
 Irati e sereni (1974)
 Conoscenza per errore (studente a Bologna del 48–49) (1978)
 In uno scacco (1979)
 Campo di battaglia (1981)
 Palla di filo (1986)
 La vita e gli amici (1992)
 La voce del corvo. Una vita (1940–2001) (2002)
 Scritti estremi di rabbia e di gioco. Narrazione, poesie, scene e prose (2005)
 Una come un'altra (2015)

Filmography

References

1924 births
2017 deaths
People from Cosenza
Gruppo 63
Italian male poets
20th-century Italian poets
21st-century Italian poets
Italian male novelists
20th-century Italian novelists
21st-century Italian novelists
Italian activists
20th-century Italian male writers
21st-century Italian male writers
Academic staff of Brera Academy
Italian magazine editors
Italian male actors
Italian art critics
Italian male non-fiction writers
Italian LGBT poets
Italian LGBT novelists